Outlaws are an American Southern rock band from Tampa, Florida. They are best known for their 1975 hit "There Goes Another Love Song" and extended guitar jam "Green Grass and High Tides" from their 1975 debut album, plus their 1980 cover of the Stan Jones  classic "(Ghost) Riders in the Sky".

History

Early years (1967–1971)
Outlaws were formed in Tampa, Florida, United States, in 1967 by guitarists/vocalists Frank Guidry, Hughie Thomasson, Herbie Pino and Hobie O'Brien. Drummer David Dix and bassist Phil Holmberg joined the band as well. Before Guidry joined the band the group was called The Four Letter Words. He had previously been in a band by the same name. By early 1968, O'Brien and Holmberg both left the band to get married  and Frank O'Keefe came in on vocals and bass. Later that year, Tommy Angarano joined Outlaws to replace Pino, bringing Hammond organ sounds and his style of vocals to the band. But after he left,  Pino was brought back in. In the spring of 1968 the group's first manager, Paul Deutekom, brought them to Epic Studios in New York City to record an album, which was never released after the band and the producer had a falling-out. The group headed back to Tampa then got another deal to go to Criteria Studios in Miami. There they recorded another album with producer Phil Gernhard. But this album was likewise never released and Gernhard vanished soon after. As part of the Gernhard record deal, bassist Ronny Elliott was brought in around this time, forcing Guidry out. Ronny played bass while O'Keefe briefly switched to guitar. But O'Keefe went back to bass after Elliott left in 1969 and Herb Pino, who had mostly been a singer up till this time, began playing more guitar as well. Drummer Monte Yoho also joined that same year to sub for Dix.

In early 1970, Outlaws were joined by two members of the Dave Graham Group that was also managed by Paul Deutekom (of Ped-Dyn Productions) The Dave Graham Group's Union leader was Monte Yoho, but he was not invited to be part of this line-up. The early 1970 Outlaws line-up was Hughie Thomasson, Frank O'Keefe, Dave Dix, Billy Jones and Dave Graham. Graham was influential in moving the group toward country-rock, especially the music of Poco. They recorded a cover of the Doors' "Five to One" as an audition to a recording deal that never materialized. This lineup ended in the spring of 1970 and the group eventually parted ways with Deutekom. Yoho and Herb Pino returned, but by 1971 the offers for gigs had slowed down and the group went into limbo for a year or so, not sure if they would continue.

In 1971 Henry Paul, a singer and guitarist who was born and raised in Hurley, New York but spent his later teen years in the Tampa area, returned from a stay in Greenwich Village NYC to form Sienna, which was more of a country rock outfit. He was joined by Monte Yoho and Frank O'Keefe. In 1972, Hughie Thomasson returned from a brief spell in New York where he had been backing folksinger Milton Carroll, joined up with Paul, Yoho and O'Keefe and Sienna became the reborn Outlaws.
 
Billy Jones, who would sometimes show up to jam with the group on organ in 1971, returned from a stint in Boulder, Colorado in 1973 and switched to guitar, giving birth to the band's first infamous guitar trio later dubbed "the Florida Guitar Army". O'Keefe left the group temporarily in 1973–74. Buzzy Meekins and another bassist named Rick Birkbeck stood in until he was able to return. In 1974, Charlie Brusco signed on as manager for Outlaws. Alan Walden (brother of Capricorn Records founder Phil Walden) was told of the group by Lynyrd Skynyrd frontman Ronnie Van Zant and he joined forces with Brusco as co-manager.

The band was the first act signed to Arista Records under Clive Davis. Davis was in the audience at a show in 1974 where the band was opening for Lynyrd Skynyrd in Columbus, Georgia. On the way to the stage for Lynyrd Skynyrd's set, lead vocalist Ronnie Van Zant said to Clive Davis who was with Charlie Brusco "If you don't sign Outlaws, you're the dumbest music person I've ever met—and I know you're not."

Outlaws' earliest well known songs were "There Goes Another Love Song" and "Green Grass and High Tides", both from their 1975 debut album Outlaws.  Their 1980 cover of "(Ghost) Riders in the Sky" from the album Ghost Riders was their biggest single chart success, reaching No. 31 on the Billboard Hot 100.

Peak (1972–1981)

While the Outlaws are generally considered to be a part of the Southern rock genre, there are distinct differences in their approach and their influences. Their primary similarity to other Southern rock bands is the dual lead guitar interplay, a defining characteristic of many Southern rock bands. However, the Outlaws' mix of country and rock elements displays the vocal harmony influences of groups like Buffalo Springfield, the Byrds, Eagles, New Riders of the Purple Sage, and Poco. Their use of three and four part harmonies set them apart from their contemporaries who usually relied on a single lead vocalist.

Hughie Thomasson's signature guitar playing style and voice were defining characteristics of the band's sound. Thomasson's guitar sound was underpinned by the use of the Fender Stratocaster (and sometimes a Telecaster) played in a quasi-country style mixed with fluid, quick blues runs. Hughie was nicknamed "The Flame" for his flaming fast guitar work. He is a member of the Fender Hall of Fame.

The other lead guitarist, Billy Jones, played mainly a Gibson Les Paul and switched between a clean and distorted sound. A good example of this can be heard on "Green Grass and High Tides" on the right stereo channel. Hughie Thomasson's distinctive Stratocaster sound can be heard on the left channel. Thomasson opens the first solo at the intro and plays the first half of the two succeeding longer solos all on the right channel. There are many video examples of his Green Grass solos on the internet.

The records released by the band between 1975 and 1980 are considered the best representation of the band's style. During this period, The Outlaws performed as a support act for non-Southern rock acts of the time, such as The Who, The Rolling Stones, Aerosmith, Queen, Black Sabbath, Rush, Blue Öyster Cult, Ted Nugent, Peter Frampton, Foghat and Van Halen. This contrast of styles was more common at that time than the packaged "genre" tours seen so often these days. The willingness of promoters to mix styles led to the Outlaws gaining a large following in the United States.

The Outlaws' style is highly characterized in their first three albums, The Outlaws (1975), Lady in Waiting (1976), and Hurry Sundown (1977). These are considered the best work of the band with all of the "classic era" band members, except for O'Keefe, who was replaced by the left-handed bass player Harvey Dalton Arnold on "Hurry Sundown" (see below for a complete roster of Outlaws members). Henry Paul left after their third album in 1977, and eventually formed the Henry Paul Band, which would release four albums from 1979-82. With the band beginning to falter in the early 80s, Billy Jones left the band in 1981. Henry Paul returned in 1983.

Later years (1982–1996)

The albums released after 1980 are largely viewed by critics as a gradual move away from the original sound that gained them success in the 1970s.The reworking of the Western-styled "Ghost Riders" in 1980 was the band's last taste of big league success, although the band released two more records, Los Hombres Malo in 1982 and Soldiers of Fortune in 1986. As the 1980s came to a close, Thomasson became the final original member of the act. Albums such as Diablo Canyon, released in 1994, were released on smaller independent record labels. The band by now was mostly confined to smaller club dates. This situation led to Thomasson accepting a guitar position in the legendary and more popular Lynyrd Skynyrd in 1996. This essentially sidelined the Outlaws for a decade, as Thomasson's voice and guitar style were just too integral a part of the Outlaws' sound for the other members to work without it successfully. In 2000, the Diablo Canyon-lineup released the album So Low, to mixed response from fans. Many cited it as being more of a solo output from Thomasson. After this release, the band again vanished from the musical environment.

Henry Paul went on to form the country band BlackHawk, which had a lot of Country chart success in the 1990s.

The other two members from the band's heyday, guitarist Billy Jones and bassist Frank O'Keefe both died in February 1995. Jones committed suicide at age 45, and a few weeks later O'Keefe died of a drug overdose at age 44.

Reunion (2005–present)

In April 2005, four of the six classic band members; Hughie Thomasson, Henry Paul, Monte Yoho, and David Dix reunited as The Outlaws. In addition to them, the band included former guitarist Chris Anderson, and new members, bassist Randy Threet, and keyboardist Dave Robbins. All three of whom had been with Paul's country group BlackHawk. Paul and Robbins left to resume their careers in BlackHawk in early 2006, but the remaining band soldiered on. They were part of the Charlie Daniels Volunteer Jam tour in the summer of 2007. Outlaws put on their last show with Hughie only a day before his untimely death, at the Tropicana Hotel and Casino in Nevada.

Band leader Hughie Thomasson died on September 9, 2007, of a heart attack in Brooksville, Florida. No release date has been announced for the studio album, Once an Outlaw, which was finished before Thomasson's death. The Thomasson family was going to release an album in early 2010, but it was cancelled. However, the album has been illegally leaked onto the internet.

A cover version of their trademark epic 10-minute track "Green Grass and High Tides" is featured as the finale in the set list for guitar and bass in the video game Rock Band and features two complicated solos.

In December 2007, 2008 Outlaws tour dates were released. At the same time, it was revealed that the band will continue despite Thomasson's death. Henry Paul became the new lead singer, frontman and bandleader. In January 2008, the Outlaws lineup would be revealed to include Henry Paul (guitars/vocals), Monte Yoho (drums), Chris Anderson (guitars/vocals), and Randy Threet (bass), along with newer additions Billy Crain (guitars), Jon Coleman (keyboards), and Brett Cartwright (bass). Cartwright left the band shortly thereafter. This would be the first lineup in Outlaws' history without Hughie Thomasson on guitar and vocals, as from the band's formation to his death, he was the only constant member, garnering him the nicknames "Mr. Outlaw" and "The Lone Outlaw".

According to the band's web site, the Outlaws announced their intention to continue to tour throughout the summer and fall of 2009 with this lineup and planned to participate in the Simple Man Cruise with Lynyrd Skynyrd in January 2010.

In May 2010, the Outlaws were featured, along with the Marshall Tucker Band, Molly Hatchet, Blackberry Smoke, and the Chris Hicks Band, on stage at Long Island Southern Jam 2010 in Babylon, N.Y. at Overlook Beach. The all-day concert featured a unique jam fest for all the bands.

For the 2010 tour, Dave Robbins returned on keyboards and Henry Paul was involved in a lawsuit brought about by Hughie Thomasson's widow, Mary, which alleged trademark violations. It was also stated on the website that the band would change its name to 'Henry Paul Band' if they were to lose the case, but to continue touring with the same setlists. In April 2011 the case was ruled upon in favor of Henry Paul, Monte Yoho and the co-defendants. They continue to touring and recording under the name Outlaws.

On July 30, 2012, it was announced on the band's website that "their first new album in 12 years" will be released on September 25, 2012, titled It's About Pride. It was also accompanied by a separately released DVD documentary about the making of the new album, called Hidin' Out In Tennessee. Led by Henry Paul, the album was critically acclaimed. A few years before the album, Paul recruited an old friend from the Henry Paul Band, lead guitarist Billy Crain to join the band. Paul and Crain collaborated on writing many of the songs for It's About Pride. The final track was a cover of the Henry Paul Band song "So Long" from its 1979 debut album, Grey Ghost.

In 2013, Billy Crain left the band group due to health issues and Steve Grisham, who performed on the 1986 album Soldiers of Fortune, rejoined as guitarist.

In 2016, the Outlaws released a 2-CD concert set titled Legacy Live.

In 2018, Dale Oliver (guitar), former touring guitarist with country band BlackHawk, replaced Chris Anderson. Paul and Yoho asked Anderson to leave due to several disagreements.

Later in 2018, Monte Yoho took a break due to his health problems. At the time, drummer Jaran Sorenson joined the band. Yoho returned in 2019 and Sorenson also continued in the band. Outlaws have two drummers again, until Yoho retired in 2021, since which Henry Paul is the only original member. The band continue touring with Sorenson. Sorenson left the band in February 2022 and Michael Grando replaced him. In September 2022 Mike Bailey replaced Grando.

The band’s new album Dixie Highway was released in 2020.

Steve Grisham retired in June 2021, after which he was replaced by Jeff Aulich. Dale Oliver fell ill in the fall of 2021 and took a break from touring. Guitarist Jimmy Dormire is currently touring with Outlaws.

Members
Current members
Henry Paul – guitars, vocals (1972–1977, 1983–1989, 2005–2006, 2008–present)
Dave Robbins – keyboards, backing vocals (2005–2006, 2010–present)
Randy Threet – bass, vocals (2005–present)
Jeff Aulich – guitars (2021–present)
Jimmy Dormire – guitars (2021–present)
Mike Bailey – drums (2022–present)

Former members

Hughie Thomasson – guitars, vocals, pedal steel guitar, banjo (1967–1996, 2005–2007; died 2007)†
Frank Guidry – Founding member - lead vocal, guitar (1967–1968)
Herb Pino – guitar, vocals (1967–1970, 1971–1972; died 2014)†
David Dix – drums, percussion (1967–1969, 1970, 1977–1987, 2005–2007)
Phil Holmberg – bass (1967)
Hobie O'Brien – guitar (1967)
Frank O'Keefe – bass, guitar, vocals (1967–1973, 1974–1976; died 1995)†
Tommy Angarano – Hammond B3, vocals (1968)
Ronny Elliot – bass (2 weeks-1968)
Monte Yoho – drums, percussion (1969, 1970–1979, 2005–2021)
Dave Graham – guitar, piano, vocals (1970)
Billy Jones – guitars, keyboards, vocals (1971, 1972–1981; died 1995)†
Buzzy Meekins – bass (1973–1974; died 2015)†
Rick Birkbeck – bass (1974)
Harvey Dalton Arnold – bass, vocals (1976–1980)
Freddie Salem – guitars, vocals (1977–1983)
Rick Cua – bass, vocals (1980–1983)
Mike Duke – keyboards, vocals (1980–1981)
Bob Jenkins – guitar, vocals (1983)
Steve Grisham – guitars, vocals (1983–1986, 2013–2021)
Chuck Glass – bass, keyboards, vocals (1983–1987)
Chris Anderson – guitars, vocals (1986–1989, 2005–2018)
Roy McDonald – bass (1987)
Anthony "Nino" Catanzaro – bass, vocals (1987, 1989–1990, 1992–1993)
Barry "B. B." Borden – drums, percussion (1987–1995)
Steve Kaye – bass (1988)
Rich Parks – guitars, vocals (1988; guest - 1991)
Ean Evans – bass, vocals (1988–1989, 1992; died 2009)†
David Lane – guitar (1989), violin (guest - 1982)
Billy Yates – guitars, vocals (1989–1991)
Billy Greer – bass, vocals (1990)
Chris "Hitman" Hicks – guitars, vocals (1990–1996)
Rob Carroll – bass, vocals (1990–1992)
Timothy Cabe – guitars, vocals (1991–1993)
Eric Wynne – bass (1992)
Jeff Howell – bass, vocals (1993–1996; died 2022)†
Billy Davis – guitars, vocals (1993–1994)
Sean Burke – drums, percussion (1995)
Frank Thomas – stand-in drummer (1995)
Kevin Neal – drums (1995–1996)
Steven Elliot – stand-in guitarist (1996)
Ric Toole – guitar (2006)
Billy Crain – guitars, vocals (2008–2013)
Jon " Squirrel" Coleman – keyboards, backing vocals (2008–2010)
Brett Cartwright – bass (2008)
Dale Oliver – guitars (2018–2021)
Jaran Sorenson – drums, percussion (2019–2022)
Michael Grando – drums (2022)

Timeline

Discography

Studio albums
Outlaws (1975) #13 US
Lady in Waiting (1976) #36 US
Hurry Sundown (1977) #51 US
Playin' to Win (1978) #60 US
In the Eye of the Storm (1979) #55 US
Ghost Riders (1980) #25 US
Los Hombres Malo (1982) #77 US
Soldiers of Fortune (1986) #160
Diablo Canyon (1994)
So Low (2000) [credited to Hughie Thomasson]
Once An Outlaw (2007) [unreleased]
It's About Pride (2012)
Dixie Highway (2020)

Live albums
Bring It Back Alive (1978) #29 US
Hittin' the Road Live (1993)
Extended Versions (2002)
Live in Los Angeles 1976 (2015)
Legacy Live (2016)
The Hits Live! (2018)
Knoxville Girl (2019)
Live at Rockpalast 1981 (2020)
Three Giants, One Tour - Live in Germany in 1992 - feat. Leslie West (2022)
Alive In America (2022)

Compilations
Greatest Hits of the Outlaws, High Tides Forever (1982)
Best of the Outlaws: Green Grass and High Tides (1996)
Platinum & Gold Collection: The Best of the Outlaws (2003)
Super Hits (2009)

Billboard Hot 100 singles
 "There Goes Another Love Song" (1975) - US No. 34 - NL No. 30
 "Breaker-Breaker" (1976) - US No. 94 - NL No. 19
 "Hurry Sundown" (1977) - US No. 60
 "(Ghost) Riders in the Sky" (1980) - US No. 31

Videography

Official video releases
Outlaws Video LP - live concert - VHS (1983)

Unofficial video releases
Outlaws Live at The Summit, Houston, Texas - DVD (1977)
Outlaws Live at The Rockpalast, Loreley, Germany - DVD (1981)
Outlaws Live at The Tower Theater, Philadelphia - DVD (1982)

References

External links

Swampland's Legends of Southern Rock, the Outlaws
Jeff Howell website

American country rock groups
Southern rock musical groups from Florida
Musical groups from Tampa, Florida
Musical groups established in 1972
Musical groups disestablished in 1996
Musical groups reestablished in 2005